Fashionably Late with Rachel Zoe was an American fashion-themed talk show which premiered on September 24, 2015, on the Lifetime cable network, following Project Runway.

Announced in July 2015, the weekly series features celebrity fashion stylist Rachel Zoe as host and focuses on "what's hot and what's not" in the fashion world. The network has ordered eight half-hour episodes. The talk show is also joined by Harper's Bazaar's editor-at-large Derek Blasberg, Zoe's husband Rodger Berman and various celebrity guests.

Episodes

References

External links 

 
 
 

2010s American television talk shows
2015 American television series debuts
2015 American television series endings
English-language television shows
Fashion-themed television series
Lifetime (TV network) original programming